The 2021–2022 UCI America Tour is the eighteenth season of the UCI America Tour. The season began on 31 October 2021 with the Vuelta a Venezuela and will end in October 2022.

The points leader, based on the cumulative results of previous races, wears the UCI America Tour cycling jersey. Throughout the season, points are awarded to the top finishers of stages within stage races and the final general classification standings of each of the stages races and one-day events. The quality and complexity of a race also determines how many points are awarded to the top finishers, the higher the UCI rating of a race, the more points are awarded.

The UCI ratings from highest to lowest are as follows:
 Multi-day events: 2.Pro, 2.1 and 2.2
 One-day events: 1.Pro, 1.1 and 1.2

Events

2021–2022

References

External links
 

 
2022
2022 in men's road cycling
2022 in North American sport
2022 in South American sport